Duve is a German language variant spelling of the surname Duwe that stems from the Low Germanic düwe (dove), a metonymic occupational name for someone who bred or sold doves. Notable people with the surname include:

 Christian de Duve (1917–2013), Nobel Prize-winning Belgian cytologist and biochemist
 Freimut Duve (1936–2020), German politician
 Karen Duve (born 1961), German author
 Thierry de Duve (born 1944), Belgian professor of modern art theory
 Vanessa Duve, German fashion model

References 

Germanic names